Algatocín is a town and municipality in the province of Málaga, part of the autonomous community of Andalusia in southern Spain. It is located in the west of the province in the Valle del Genal, being one of the townsⁿ that make up the comarca of the Serrania de Ronda.

Geography

Location
Algatocín lies in the middle of the Valle del Bajo Genal. It extends from the mountains to the river banks of the Genal, and is full of hills and vegetation.

Flora and fauna
The municipality shares similar characteristics in terms of flora and fauna with the rest of the Valle del Genal. Highlighting some of them are:

Flora
 Algerian oak (Quercus canariensis)
 Cork oak (Quercus suber)
 Strawberry tree (Arbutus unedo)
 Chestnut (Castanea sativa)
 Aleppo pine (Pinus halepensis)
 Mastic tree (Pistacia lentiscus)
 Fern (Davallia canariensis)
 Gorse
 Heather

Mammals
 Wild boar (Sus scrofa)
 Red fox (Vulpes vulpes)
 European rabbit (Oryctolagus cuniculus)
 Common genet (Genetta genetta)
 Egyptian mongoose (Herpestes ichneumon)

Birds
 Common kestrel (Falco tinnunculus)
 Eurasian sparrowhawk (Accipiter nisus)
 Booted eagle (Hieraaetus pennatus)
 Common cuckoo (Cuculus canorus)
 European robin (Erithacus rubecula)
 Common nightingale (Luscinia megarhynchos)

History

Antiquity and the Middle Ages
The earliest evidence of human settlement in the lands of the present municipality of Algatocín go back to the Bronze Age as pottery was found in Cerro Gordo. In this same place, around 1,000 BC, the remains of an Iberian oppidum or defensive enclosure have been found. Later, during Roman rule, and in Cerro Gordo as well, seemed to emerge a major city called Vesci and a Roman road nearby.

References

Municipalities in the Province of Málaga